Guillaume Boronad (born 5 May 1979 in Perpignan) is a French professional football player. Currently, he plays in the Championnat de France amateur for Sporting Toulon Var.

He played on the professional level in Ligue 2 for Sporting Perpignan Roussillon and FC Rouen and in the Portuguese Liga for F.C. Penafiel. in 2009, after reports claimed he had signed for Leeds United, Leeds denied reports claiming they had never heard of the player. When the player was later asked by a Leeds supporter why he had not signed for the club via social networking site Facebook, he responded with the now famous WACCOE quip "Sorry. My agent betrayed"

References

1979 births
Living people
French footballers
French expatriate footballers
Expatriate footballers in Portugal
FC Martigues players
FC Rouen players
AS Cannes players
F.C. Penafiel players
Ligue 2 players
ÉFC Fréjus Saint-Raphaël players
Association football midfielders